Sortland Church is a parish church of the Church of Norway in Sortland Municipality in Nordland county, Norway. It is located in the town of Sortland. It is one of the three churches for the Sortland parish which is part of the Vesterålen prosti (deanery) in the Diocese of Sør-Hålogaland. The white, wooden, neo-gothic church was built in a cruciform style in 1901 using plans drawn up by the architects Carl Julius Bergstrøm and Karl Norum. The church seats about 696 people.

History
The earliest existing historical records of this church date back to 1381, but the church was not new at that time. There have been several churches in Sortland over the centuries. Not much is known about the medieval churches in Sortland, but records show a new church was built in 1676. It was a log building in a cruciform design. In 1803, the church was heavily renovated.

In 1814, this church served as an election church. Together with more than 300 other parish churches across Norway, it was a polling station for elections to the 1814 Norwegian Constituent Assembly which wrote the Constitution of Norway. This was Norway's first national elections. Each church parish was a constituency that elected people called "electors" who later met together in each county to elect the representatives for the assembly that was to meet in Eidsvoll later that year.

By the early 1900s, the church was in poor condition. The new church was completed in 1902 and it seats nearly 700 people. After the new church was completed, the old church was torn down. The site of the old church was marked with a small building with the old church steeple and church bell on top and the area was made into a park.

Media gallery

See also
List of churches in Sør-Hålogaland

References

Sortland
Churches in Nordland
Wooden churches in Norway
Cruciform churches in Norway
20th-century Church of Norway church buildings
Churches completed in 1902
14th-century establishments in Norway
Norwegian election church